Jungle Nest is an action comedy and adventure television series produced by Non Stop and Disney XD Latin America, being the second program of Disney XD in Argentina, after Peter Punk. It premiered on 13 February 2016, and ended on 5 June 5, 2016.

Synopsis
A 17-year-old boy named Julián (Santiago Magariños) goes with his uncle Max (Esteban Prol) to spend the summer in his ecological hotel, located in the middle of the jungle and built in the treetops. The series develops around them and three other adventurers, who live multiple situations in the jungle.

Cast
Santiago Magariños as Julián
Esteban Prol as Max
Tupac Larriera as Oso
Giovanna Reynaud as Gala
Ivan Arango as Rocco
Ming Chen as Mei Ling
Valentín Villafañe as Markus Montalban
César Bordón as Clodomiro Montalbán

References

External links 

2016 Argentine television series debuts
Television series by Disney
Disney XD original programming
Disney Channels Worldwide original programming
Spanish-language Disney Channel original programming
2016 Argentine television series endings
Television series about teenagers